The 1979 Davis Cup was the 68th edition of the Davis Cup, the most important tournament between national teams in men's tennis. 52 teams would enter the competition, 29 in the Europe Zone, 13 in the Americas Zone, and 10 in the Eastern Zone.

Following years of protests from various national sides, South Africa were expelled from the Davis Cup for failing to abandon its apartheid policies. For many years the Davis Cup organisers had been reluctant to let political issues affect the competition, however following several years of defaults by national teams and threats of a boycott, the organisers of the tournament were forced to resolve the political disagreements by expelling the South African side. Canada, Mexico, Venezuela and the Caribbean/West Indies teams had all pulled out of the 1978 tournament, and in 1977 the United States, Great Britain and France had all withdrawn in protest to the continued politicisation of the Cup before eventually re-entering following concessions. South Africa would not be allowed to participate again in the Davis Cup until 1992, when significant progress had been made to bring about the end of apartheid.

The United States defeated Argentina in the Americas Inter-Zonal final, Australia defeated New Zealand in the Eastern Zone final, and Italy and Czechoslovakia were the winners of the two Europe Zones, defeating Great Britain and Sweden respectively.

In the Inter-Zonal Zone, the United States defeated Australia and Italy defeated Czechoslovakia in the semifinals. The United States then defeated Italy in the final to win their 26th title overall and their second consecutive title. The final was held at the Civic Auditorium in San Francisco, California, United States on 14–16 December.

Americas Zone

North & Central America Zone

Preliminary rounds

Main Draw

South America Zone

Preliminary rounds

Main Draw

Americas Inter-Zonal Final
United States vs. Argentina

Eastern Zone

Preliminary rounds

Main Draw

Final
New Zealand vs. Australia

Europe Zone

Zone A

Preliminary rounds

Main Draw

Final
Italy vs. Great Britain

Zone B

Pre-qualifying round

Preliminary rounds

Main Draw

Final
Czechoslovakia vs. Sweden

Inter-Zonal Zone

Draw

Semifinals
Australia vs. United States

Italy vs. Czechoslovakia

Final
United States vs. Italy

References

External links
Davis Cup Official Website

 
Davis Cups by year
Davis Cup
Davis Cup
Davis Cup
Davis Cup
Davis Cup
Davis Cup